TIGIT (also called T cell immunoreceptor with Ig and ITIM domains) is an immune receptor present on some T cells and natural killer cells (NK). It is also identified as WUCAM and Vstm3. TIGIT could bind to CD155 (PVR) on dendritic cells (DCs), macrophages, etc. with high affinity, and also to CD112 (PVRL2) with lower affinity.

Numerous clinical trials on TIGIT-blockade in cancer have recently been initiated, predominantly combination treatments. The first interim results show promise for combined TIGIT and PD-L1 co-blockade in solid cancer patients. Mechanistically, research has shown that TIGIT-Fc fusion protein could interact with PVR on dendritic cells and increase its IL-10 secretion level/decrease its IL-12 secretion level under LPS stimulation, and also inhibit T cell activation in vivo.
TIGIT's inhibition of NK cytotoxicity can be blocked by antibodies against its interaction with PVR and the activity is directed through its ITIM domain.

Clinical significance

TIGIT regulates T-cell mediated immunity via the CD226/TIGIT-PVR pathway.

HIV
During Human Immunodeficiency Virus (HIV) infection, TIGIT expressing CD8+ T cells have been shown to be expanded and associated with clinical markers of HIV disease progression in a diverse group of HIV infected individuals. Elevated TIGIT levels remained sustained even among those with undetectable viral loads. A large fraction of HIV-specific CD8+ T cells simultaneously express both TIGIT and another negative checkpoint receptor, Programmed Death Protein 1 (PD-1) and retained several features of exhausted T cells. Blocking these pathways with novel targeted monoclonal antibodies synergistically rejuvenated HIV-specific CD8+ T cell responses. Further, the TIGIT pathway is active in the rhesus macaque non-human primate model, and mimics expression and function during Simian Immunodeficiency Virus (SIV) infection. This pathway can potentially be targeted to enhance killing of HIV infected cells during "Shock and Kill" HIV curative approaches.

Cancer
TIGIT and PD-1 has been shown to be over expressed on tumor antigen-specific (TA-specific) CD8+ T cells and CD8+ tumor infiltrating lymphocytes (TILs) from individuals with melanoma. Blockade of TIGIT and PD-1 led to increased cell proliferation, cytokine production, and degranulation of TA-specific CD8+ T cells and TIL  CD8+ T cells. It can be considered an immune checkpoint. Co-blockade of TIGIT and PD-1 pathways elicits tumor rejection in preclinical murine models. In humans, the CITYSCAPE clinical trial (NCT03563716) evaluated the combination of the anti-TIGIT antibody tiragolumab in combination with the anti-PD-L1 antibody atezolizumab in patients with newly-diagnosed non-small cell lung cancer whose tumors expressed PD-L1. After a median follow-up of 16.3 months, the combination of tiragolumab and atezolizumab reduced the risk of disease progression or death by 38% compared to atezolizumab monotherapy. In a subset of patients with high PD-L1 expression (at least 50% of tumor cells expressing PD-L1), the combination of tiragolumab with atezolizumab further reduced the risk of disease progression or death by 71% compared to atezolizumab monotherapy. Overall, patients who received the combination of atezolizumab and tiragolumab lived a median of 23.2 months, compared to 14.5 months with atezolizumab monotherapy.However, the randomized phase III skyscraper study failed to confirm these results (press release).

See also
 T cell receptor
 Antigen

References

Further reading

Human proteins